is a 1974 romantic drama film from Japan. It was directed by Katsumi Nishikawa and starred Momoe Yamaguchi and Tomokazu Miura. This was the first of a series of romantic films starring the couple.

The film is based on the story The Dancing Girl of Izu by Yasunari Kawabata. Nishikawa also directed Izu no Odoriko film produced in 1963.

1974 Cast
 Momoe Yamaguchi as Kahoru
 Tomokazu Miura as Kawashima
 Jin Nakayama as Eikichi
 Tomomi Satō as Chiyoko
 Atsuko Ichinomiya as Nobu
 Masami Shiho as Sayuko
 Sayuri Ishikawa as Okimi
 Nami Munakata as Yoshiko
 Yoriko Tanaka as Shino
 Yumiko Arisaki as Otoki
 Nekohachi Edoya III as Toriya
 Koenyū Sanyūtei as Kamiya
 Narrated by Jūkichi Uno

1963 Cast
 Hideki Takahashi as Kawasaki
 Sayuri Yoshinaga as Kaoru
 Mitsuo Hamada as Student
 Shōbun Inoue Paper seller

Release
The film was released on 28 December 1974 in Japan.

Reception
The film was covered in a special issue of film magazine Kindai Eiga.

References

External links

1974 films
Films based on works by Yasunari Kawabata
Films based on short fiction
1970s Japanese films